The Base Palissy is the database of French movable heritage, created and maintained by the French Ministry of Culture. It was created in 1989, and placed online in 2002. The database is periodically updated, and contains more than 515,000 entries as of October 2020. It covers several types of objects: stained glass, paintings, sculptures, religious and civil objects, scientific collections and industrial heritage. Many, but not all of the described objects are also listed as historical monuments. The database was named after 16th century potter and writer Bernard Palissy.

See also
 Base Mérimée, database of French monumental and architectural heritage
 List of heritage registers globally
 Monument historique, the official classification for French historic monuments

References

External links

Search engine Base Palissy

History websites of France
Government databases in France
1989 establishments in France
Databases in France
Historic sites in France
Heritage registers in France